This is a list of flag bearers who have represented Germany at the Olympics.

Flag bearers carry the national flag of their country at the opening ceremony of the Olympic Games.

See also
Germany at the Olympics
List of flag bearers for East Germany at the Olympics
List of flag bearers for West Germany at the Olympics

References

Germany at the Olympics
Germany
Olympic flag-bearers